Paleni (Paléni), also known as Wara (Ouara, Ouala), is a minor Niger–Congo language spoken in the village of Faniagara in Burkina.

References

Wara–Natyoro languages
Languages of Burkina Faso